Hentzia palmarum, the common hentz jumper, is a species of jumping spider in the family Salticidae. It is found in North America, Bermuda, the Bahamas, and Cuba.

References

Further reading

External links

 

Salticidae
Articles created by Qbugbot
Spiders described in 1832
Spiders of North America